Charles W. Moors was a member of the Wisconsin State Assembly.

Biography
Moors was born on November 29, 1842 in Lancaster, Massachusetts. During the American Civil War, he served with the 30th Wisconsin Volunteer Infantry Regiment of the Union Army.

Political career
Moors was a member of the Assembly in 1880 and 1881. Additionally, he was Town Clerk and Town Treasurer of Hancock (town), Wisconsin. He was a Republican.

References

People from Lancaster, Massachusetts
People from Hancock, Wisconsin
Republican Party members of the Wisconsin State Assembly
City and town treasurers in the United States
City and town clerks
People of Wisconsin in the American Civil War
Union Army soldiers
1842 births
Year of death missing